Sahrawi nationality law (also romanized with Saharawi) is the law of the Sahrawi Arab Democratic Republic (SADR) governing nationality and citizenship. The SADR is a partially recognized state which claims sovereignty over the entire territory of Western Sahara, but only administers part of it. The SADR also administers Sahrawi refugee camps.

When Spain relinquished Spanish Sahara, there was no internationally recognized succession of states agreement that defined the terms of the transfer of authority to a new nation-state. Sovereignty has been disputed for nearly fifty years by the SADR and Morocco, which were engaged in open warfare until 1991 and have engaged in a more limited war since 2020.

Despite a negotiated United Nations-administered 1991 ceasefire that included a settlement of to the state succession issue via a referendum that was agreed to by the parties to the dispute, the legal status of the territory has not been resolved since the referendum has yet to be held. As such, Morocco, whose administration of Western Sahara is considered by the United Nations to be a foreign occupation, does not have legal authority to grant nationality or citizenship to the Sahrawi people. Therefore, because the people of Western Sahara have not been able to exercise a referendum on self-determination in a manner recognized by international law, neither the nationality law of Morocco nor that of any other sovereign nation can be imposed upon them. On the other hand, the SADR has never passed an actual nationality law which governs the acquisition of nationality or citizenship for the Sahrawi people.

As a result, Sahrawis who do not live under the authority of the SADR can only gain the rights of citizenship by becoming a national of a foreign state. Under international law, other Sahrawi people are in a legal limbo of statelessness.

International law applicability
Under international law, the four elements that are involved in succession are 1) a defined territory, with 2) a permanent population, and 3) a government that is 4) capable of entering into agreements with other states. Typically, the principle of uti possidetis juris, which holds that successor states should retain the integrity of the borders preceding state, underpins the transferring policies of the United Nations and has typically been used in Africa.  

Closely tied to those rights and obligations are the consent of the people involved to accept their change in jurisdiction or governance. In 1923, a precedent was established by the International Court of Justice in The Hague that a nation cannot impose its nationality upon foreign nationals without their agreement. Later, the Declaration on the Granting of Independence to Colonial Countries and Peoples adopted on 14 December 1960, specified that persons inhabiting a colonial territory had the right to self-determination and free choice over their independence. 

Nationality differs from the domestic relationship of rights and obligations between a national and the nation, known as citizenship.  Nationality describes the relationship of an individual to the state under international law; citizenship is the domestic relationship of an individual within the nation. Some nations use the terms nationality and citizenship as synonyms, despite their legal distinction. Nationality is typically obtained under the principle of jus soli, i.e. birth in the territory, or jus sanguinis, i.e. descent from someone who is a national of the country. However, it also can be granted to persons with an affiliation to the country or a national, such as through marriage, or to a permanent resident who has lived in the country for a given period of time through naturalization or registration. When new states are established, typically nationality is extended to all those who were born (or descend from someone born) in the territory of the new state, those who were lawfully resident in that territory for a specified period before the establishment of the new state, or those who habitially reside there and would otherwise become stateless upon the withdrawal of nationality by the preceding state.

History and background
Spain had established a protectorate in Spanish Sahara in 1884 by signing agreements with leadership of the inhabitants. Between 1958 and 1975, Spanish Sahara was classified as a Spanish province, and as such, any person born in the territory was conferred Spanish nationality. Morocco gained independence in 1956, and began a nationalist campaign to rebuild Greater Morocco and acquire any territory, by force if necessary, which had been colonized by the French or Spanish and had a shared heritage, history, or language with the Morocco. Those territories included the totalities of the French and Spanish protectorates, and neighboring territories or parts of territories of Algeria, Mali, Mauritania, Spanish Sahara, and others. Beginning in 1963, the United Nations attempted to resolve the issue for Spanish Sahara, focusing on decolonization and the territorial dispute over the area between Mauritania, Morocco, and Spain. 

The United Nations General Assembly Resolution 2229, issued on 20 December 1966, demanded that Spain consult with the persons inhabiting their territories of Ifni and Spanish Sahara, and the governments of Mauritania and Morocco or other interested parties, and schedule a referendum for the population of those areas to determine the conditions of their decolonization. The Spanish position was that the area was a province of Spain and that the population would have to request independence. The claims of Mauritanian and Moroccan officials were that they had historical and cultural ties with the region that had been severed by colonization. A visiting mission in 1975 concluded that the inhabitants desired independence. The International Court of Justice (ICJ) heard from all parties and on 16 October 1975 ruled that though the area had historical links with Morocco and Mauritania, the ties were insufficient to prove the sovereignty of either country over the territory at the time of the Spanish colonization. On that basis, they advised that the inhabitants had the right to self-determination. 

The Moroccan response to the ruling was to initiate the Green March on 6 November 1975 and annex Spanish Sahara. On 14 November 1975, Spain, Morocco, and Mauritania signed the Madrid Accords agreeing to establish a cooperative transitional administration over the territory, now to be known as Western Sahara.  On 19 November 1975, Spain passed Law 40, which called for passage of laws to facilitate decolonizing the territory. But Francisco Franco, Spain's head of state, died the following day and no further legislation was passed concerning processes of decolonization until 4 June 1976, when Royal Decree 2258 was issued. The decree stipulated that Sahrawis wishing to retain their Spanish nationality could apply to do so for one year, but it had a provision that applicants had to appear in Spain and could not process an application through consular services. 

On 27 February 1976, the Sahrawi Arab Democratic Republic was declared by the Polisario Front, a liberation movement for Western Sahara, and a government-in-exile was established in Tindouf, Algeria. Military conflict between the Sahrawi Republic, Mauritania, and Morocco broke out and continued until 1979, when Mauritania entered into an agreement with the Polisario to abandon claims to the territory. That year, Mauritania renounced its claims to the area and the Moroccan sultan extended Moroccan nationality to Sahrawis. The UN General Assembly urged Morocco in Resolution 34/37 of 21 November 1979 to enter into the peace process and allow Sahrawis to hold a referendum for self-determination, but fighting continued until 1988, when both parties agreed to an armistice and UN assistance in resolving the dispute. In 1991, the Commission of the United Nations Mission for the Referendum in Western Sahara (MINURSO) called for the referendum to be scheduled. Unable to determine who would be allowed to participate in the process, the peace process was aborted and no referendum held.

Since that time, there has been no agreement on how to define the Sahrawi people — either based on the 1974 Spanish census of the territory, inclusion of all Saharan tribes with historic ties to the territory, or the present population which because of Moroccan policy has displaced people native to the territory — and determine who would be eligible to participate in a referendum. As such, no referendum has successfully been held to determine whether the Sahrawi people consent to a merger with another state or desire independence, and any imposed nationality upon the people by outside entities would be out of compliance with international legal norms.

Normally, the requirements to gain nationality, that is, formal legal membership in a nation, are regulated by a country's constitution, nationality law, and various international agreements to which the country is a signatory. These laws determine who is, or is eligible to be, a national of a sovereign state. The difficulty faced by the Sahrawi people is that when Spain relinquished its control over Western Sahara, no agreement established a successor state or transferred sovereignty and the state's rights and obligations. The United Nations still considers Spain to legally hold administrating power in the territory, maintaining that Morocco has no legal authority and is an occupying foreign power.  

However, Morocco controls 85 percent of the country and the Sahrawi Arab Democratic Republic controls the remaining fifteen percent. The Sahrawi Republic is a partially recognized non-self-governing territory which claims sovereignty over the entirety of Western Sahara, but has limited internal administration over only a portion of the territory and no externally recognized sovereignty.

Attempts at resolution
In 1997, another round of UN negotiations culminated in the signing of the Houston Accords, which reestablished a time table for a referendum, but ultimately broke down when Morocco refused to allow the referendum to have an option for Sahrawi independence on the ballot. Despite a 2002 determination of the United Nations Legal Counsel that Morocco had no legal administering authority for Western Sahara, Morocco has continued to occupy the territory. In 2007, both sides submitted plans to settle the dispute. Morocco's plan included granting Western Sahara autonomy as a province of Morocco. The Sahrawi Republic rejected the plan and proposed instead that a referendum be held to allow the Sahrawi people to determine whether they want independence or a merger. Though both sides have remained entrenched on these positions, the Polisario announced they would be willing to allow  Moroccan nationals living in Western Sahara to become Sahrawi nationals and vote in a supervised referendum on Western Sahara to determine independence or integration with Morocco. The 2007, "Proposal of the Polisario Front for a Mutually Acceptable Political Solution Assuring the Self-Determination of the People of Western Sahara" stated it would negotiate on:

Another round of negotiations held in 2010 saw no compromise in the positions. Morocco remained willing to grant the Sahrawis the autonomy to govern local affairs in a Moroccan province, while the Polisario maintained that Western Sahara is not a sovereign territory of Morocco. Talks broke down in 2016, with Morocco withdrawing from participation in MINURSO negotiations. The ceasefire collapsed in 2020. Despite the renewal of the mandate for MINURSO through October 2022, no solution to the stalemate over Western Sahara's sovereignty has been forthcoming and conflict has continued.

Additional difficulties for future resolution of the issue is that without a comprehensive Sahrawi nationality law, who officially are recognized as Sahrawi is undefined. In 2018, Moroccan figures showed the population of the areas it controls in Western Sahara to include 485,000 people, of whom only twenty percent are Sahrawi. Based on United Nations estimates of the population of the entire territory of Western Sahara, in 2019, the population of the territory controlled by the Sahrawi Republic would approximate 82,000 people. Further, Morocco has invested billions of dollars in developing the infrastructure of the territory it controls, fortifying its security with defensive walls and troops, and implementing policies to assimilate the Sahrawi people and moroccanize them. 

In March 2013, Hassan Serghouchni, a Moroccan political prisoner in the 1980s residing in Oujda, sent a letter to the Sahrawi Republic embassy in Algiers asking for the concession of the Sahrawi nationality, being the first Moroccan to demand it. In October 2012 Serghouchni renounced Moroccan nationality.

National identity and sovereignty
Though the  Polisario Front — the government of SADR — has existed for more than forty years, the Constitution of the Sahrawi Arab Democratic Republic does not define how citizenship is acquired or exercised. The Sahrawi Republic promulgated its Constitution of the Sahrawi Arab Democratic Republic in February 1976, amended in August 1976, expanded in 1982 and 1985, and revised in 1999 and 2015. The 1999 Sahrawi constitution, provided that the Sahrawi National Council could make "fundamental legislation on nationality, the right to citizenship and civil status" and "general laws relating to the status of foreigners". Article 110 of the revised 2015 Constitution continues to provide that the Sahrawi National Council can draft legislation to define nationality, the rights of citizens, and civil status, but such legislation has not been created. Nonetheless, the 1999 Constitution, revised in 2015, does not define its nationals, providing only that they are African, Arab, and Muslim people.

Sahrawi people who fall under the jurisdiction of SADR have a range of rights and obligations which reflect the particular circumstances of the Sahrawi Republic. As a government-in-exile, the SADR also provides birth certificates, national identity cards, and passports to persons within its jurisdiction of Western Sahara and in the Algerian refugee camps.
The following obligations are imposed on Sahrawi citizens under Chapter Five of Sahrawi constitution:
to respect the Constitution and the laws of the Republic;
to defend the country and participate in its liberation;
to defend national unity and fight against all violations of the will of the people;
to participate in national service as may be laid down by law.

The Sahrawi Constitution guarantees its citizens are equal before the law with inalienable rights to free expression, education, health care, ownership of private property, and other protections to guarantee social welfare. Following Sahrawi tradition, primacy of the people, culture, and community take precedence over the institutions and traditions developed during colonization. The society is divided into wilayahs, provincial governing administrations, and daïras, local districts. Each district was traditionally named after the location to which the inhabitants had originated in Western Sahara, to enable reintegration of the population when independence occurred. Persons living in the jurisdiction of the Sahrawi Arab Democratic Republic, including those in Algerian camps are allowed to participate in their governance, vote, and hold administrators to account. At the local level, individuals are assigned to participate in one of five committees – education, family and legal affairs, health, industry and craftsmanship , and provisioning (distribution networks). An annual congress is held to elect officials responsible for the administration of the daïras and wilayahs. The daïra officials bring the concerns of their constituents to the wilayah officials who debate uniform policy solutions to the needs of the communities.

Statelessness

The issue of statelessness is internationally governed by the Convention Relating to the Status of Stateless Persons of 1954 and the Convention on the Reduction of Statelessness of 1961. Stateless persons are not legally considered as nationals by any recognized state. Lack of nationality and statelessness makes persons vulnerable to breaches of their human rights, such as discrimination in their ability to live or work in a particular place, to acquire education or health services, or be protected from abuse such as trafficking. It can also result in arbitrary treatment with regard to their rights, expulsion from the country, or restrictions of movement, meaning they are unable to leave or re-enter a territory.

For the Sahrawi, the distinction between nationality and citizenship is legally significant. Although some Sahrawi live under the jurisdiction of the SADR and its protections, a greater number of Sahrawi people are displaced and include refugees in Algeria, persons living in both Moroccan- and Polisario-controlled portions of Western Sahara, as well as a large diaspora. 

There are approximately 150,000 Sahrawi refugees living in refugee camps in Algeria who have no access to Algerian nationality. Since 1979, Sahrawis have been able to acquire Moroccan nationality. Sahrawi people who were residents of Spanish Sahara before it relinquished the territory in 1975 were able to gain Spanish nationality for themselves and their descendants with documentation — such as a birth or marriage certificate, school records, or family registry, to confirm their ties to the territory — through a facilitated procedure enacted in 1998. However, the 1998 procedure was based upon being able to prove that the applicant could not leave Western Sahara between 1975 and 1976 and thus were unable to comply with the requirements of the 1976 Royal Decree to apply in Spain. A ruling of the Supreme Court of Spain in 2020 withdrew the right to Spanish nationality basing its decision upon an interpretation that the Francoist court which declared Western Sahara a province was in error. The court found that Western Sahara was never part of its national territory. The court ruled that as Law 40 of 1975 required decolonization, the area was not a province but a colony and as such under the Spanish Civil Code nationality could not be obtained unless a child was born in Spain.

Lacking a sovereign state, some Sahrawis may have acquired citizenship from various states, such as Spain, Morocco, Mauritania, or other nations.  For Sahrawi refugees living in Algeria, the Algerian government may make travel documents available to persons who need to travel in countries in which the Sahrawi Republic is not recognized, but these documents do not imply that the holders are Algerian. The majority of Sahrawis have not acquired actual citizenship because of statelessness and the dispute over their territory.

See also
Sahrawi passport

Notes

References

Bibliography

 

 

Nationality law
Citizenship
Nationality
 
Western Sahara conflict
Sahrawi nationalism
Settlers
Settlement schemes in Africa